Church of Saints Peter and Paul in Ražanka is a Roman Catholic church in Belarusian town . The building was constructed in 1674 and rebuilt in 1827, it is included into the national historic heritage list.

History 

Some sources place construction date as early as 1674, however, other believe it could have been built in the late XVI for the Calvinists and given to the Catholics later. However, the Catholics reject this hypothesis. According to the documents, the church was consecrated on June 17, 1674, in the name of Saint Peter and St Paul.

In 1827 the church was rebuilt by order of Count Ludwik Michał Pac. The architect Enrico Marconi reconstructed it in Neo Gothic style that was spreading in England in the second part of the XVIII century. Some researchers presume that Marconi rebuilt the church completely and the building opened in 1827 should be considered a new one.

In 1924–1925, another restoration was made without changing the church's exterior.

In 1960, the church was closed by order of the Soviet authorities, a grocery shop was opened in the building. In 1989 it was returned to the Catholic church, restored and reopened in 1990.

Architecture 
The church is a historical monument of Neo Gothic style, though some art historians describe it as eclectic.

The single nave is topped by a low pentagon-shaped apse. Two symmetrical side chapels are connected to the side walls of the main volume. A small sacristy is located to the north part of the apse. At the south-west side of the church there is a three-tire bell tower. On both sides of the main entrance sculptures of St Paul and St Peter are standing in the niches. The facades are covered with Rubble masonry.

References 

19th-century Roman Catholic church buildings in Belarus
Churches in Belarus
Roman Catholic churches in Belarus